Jules Siegfried (12 February 1837 – 26 September 1922) was a French politician. He served as a member of the Chamber of Deputies from 1885 to 1897, and from 1902 to 1922.

Siegfried was active in the social Protestant movement, as were other Musée social members such as Charles Gide (1847–1932), Édouard Gruner (1849–1933), Henri Monod (1843–1911) and Pierre-Paul Guieysse (1841–1914).

He died in Le Havre on 26 September 1922.

References

Sources

1837 births
1922 deaths
Politicians from Mulhouse
French Protestants
Democratic Republican Alliance politicians
Members of the 4th Chamber of Deputies of the French Third Republic
Members of the 5th Chamber of Deputies of the French Third Republic
Members of the 6th Chamber of Deputies of the French Third Republic
Members of the 8th Chamber of Deputies of the French Third Republic
Members of the 9th Chamber of Deputies of the French Third Republic
Members of the 10th Chamber of Deputies of the French Third Republic
Members of the 11th Chamber of Deputies of the French Third Republic
Members of the 12th Chamber of Deputies of the French Third Republic
French Senators of the Third Republic
Senators of Seine-Maritime